Sleep Medicine Reviews is a bimonthly peer-reviewed medical journal covering research on the diagnosis and therapy of sleep disturbances and disorders (sleep medicine). It was established in 1997 and is published by Elsevier. The editors-in-chief are J. Krieger (Louis Pasteur University) and Michael V Vitiello (University of Washington).

Abstracting and indexing 
The journal is abstracted and indexed in:

According to the Journal Citation Reports, the journal has a 2018 impact factor of 10.517.

References

External links 
 

Sleep medicine journals
Elsevier academic journals
Bimonthly journals
Publications established in 1997
English-language journals